Jordan women's national under-17 football team represents Jordan in international youth football competitions.

Jordan had played the FIFA U-17 Women's World Cup as hosts in 2016. They also had played the AFC U-17 Asian Cup once back in 2013 where they bowed out of group stage.

Results and friendlies

2023

FIFA U-17 Women's World Cup record 
 2008 to  2014 – Did not Qualify
 2016 – Group Stage
 2018 to  2020 – Did not Qualify

AFC U-17 Women's Asian Cup record 
 2005 - Did Not Qualify
 2007 - Did Not Qualify
 2009 - Did Not Qualify
 2011 - Did Not Qualify
 2013 - Group Stage
 2015 - Did Not Qualify
 2017 - Did Not Qualify
 2019 - Did not Qualify
 2024 - TBD

Current squad
Squad for the 2016 FIFA U-17 Women's World Cup.

See also
Jordan women's national football team
Jordan women's national under-20 football team

References

External links 

Asian women's national under-17 association football teams
under-17
Youth football in Jordan
Arabic women's national under-17 association football teams